FK Teplice is an association football club from Teplice, Czech Republic. The team has participated in nine seasons of Union of European Football Associations (UEFA) club competitions, including one season in the Champions League, five seasons in the UEFA Cup and Europa League and four seasons in the Intertoto Cup. It has played 34 UEFA games, resulting in 11 wins, 4 draws and 19 defeats. The club's first appearance was in the 1971–72 UEFA Cup. The club's best performance is reaching the third round of the UEFA Cup, which they managed in the 2003–04 season.

The club plays its home matches at Na Stínadlech, an all-seater stadium in Teplice. The ground can host 18,221 spectators and was opened in 1973, replacing club's old ground U drožďárny as a home venue. The club's biggest win in European competition is the 5–1 defeat of Santa Clara in the 2002 UEFA Intertoto Cup, while its heaviest defeat is also by a 5–1 scoreline, having lost to Bologna in the same competition. Pavel Verbíř has appeared in the most UEFA matches for Teplice, with 31 games to his name. He is also the leading scorer with 4 goals.

Key

 S = Seasons
 P = Played
 W = Games won
 D = Games drawn
 L = Games lost
 F = Goals for
 A = Goals against
 aet = Match determined after extra time
 ag = Match determined by away goals rule

 SF = Semi-finals
 QF = Quarter-finals
 Group = Group stage
 Group 2 = Second group stage
 PO = Play-off round
 R3 = Round 3
 R2 = Round 2
 R1 = Round 1
 Q3 = Third qualification round
 Q2 = Second qualification round
 Q1 = First qualification round
 Q = Qualification round

All-time statistics
The following is a list of the all-time statistics from Teplice's games in the three UEFA tournaments it has participated in, as well as the overall total. The list contains the tournament, the number of seasons (S), games played (P), won (W), drawn (D) and lost (L), as well as goals for (GF), goals against (GA) and goal difference (GD). The statistics include qualification matches and is up to date as of the 2013–14 season.

Matches 
The following is a complete list of matches played by Teplice in UEFA tournaments. It includes the season, tournament, the stage, the opponent club and its country, the date, the venue and the score, with Teplice's score noted first. It is up to date as of the end of 30 June 2014.

References

Europe
Teplice